South Carolina Highway 90 (SC 90) is a  state highway in Horry County, within the northeastern part of the U.S. state of South Carolina. It travels from Red Hill (near Conway) to Little River. It provides a direct connection from Conway to the northern Grand Strand in Little River.

Route description
SC 90 begins at an intersection with US 378 Truck/U.S. Route 501 Bus./US 701 Truck/SC 90 Truck in the census designated place (CDP) of Red Hill. SC 90, concurrent with US 378 Truck and US 701 Truck, travels east, first briefly through an area of industrial warehouses, then on a arc curving to the south past numerous houses. After turning to the east again, outside of Red Hill, the density of houses lining the road decreases. The truck routes split off at Old Reaves Ferry Road. Major roads that SC 90 intersects include International Drive (providing a connection to Robert Grissom Parkway in Myrtle Beach) and Old Reaves Ferry Road (providing a connection with SC 905). After an interchange with SC 22, the highway enters the community of Wampee. The highway curves to the southeast at S-Hwy 57 where it heads through open space and farmland. It reaches an intersection with Robert Edge Parkway (unsigned SC 31 Conn.) near North Myrtle Beach. The intersection marks the western terminus of the parkway and is the entrance to the North Myrtle Beach Sports Complex. The parkway also provides access to SC 31 (Carolina Bays Parkway).

SC 90 heads east, first under SC 31, then past numerous housing developments. It also passes in front of North Myrtle Beach Middle School. Upon its intersection with Sea Mountain Highway, much more commercial businesses line the highway. The highway also enters the CDP of Little River at this intersection. Shortly thereafter, Old Highway 17 (unsigned SC 90 Conn.) intersects SC 90. It comes to an interchange with US 17 and SC 9, though no access to northbound US 17/SC 9 is provided at the interchange. For its final , SC 90 passes many businesses before curving to the north and ending at an intersection with US 17. Here, the roadway continues as Fairway Drive.

History

South Carolina Highway 90 was established in 1929 running from what was then South Carolina Highway 38 to South Carolina Highway 9. 

In some times SCDOT will construct and widen SC 90 into a four-lane multilane roadway/Divided highway with a Cement Median and without the grass it will have road signs and road sign ganties with light fixtures, mileage signs, metal poles, Street lights, traffic lights, side road, T Road, Divided highway ends, signal ahead signs and so many more of them, the Old Reaves Ferry Road connects to SC 905 and it is not intersected with it. The interchange of US 17/SC 9 would have the Trumpet Interchange before and after the bridge across the Intracoastal Waterway from Little River to N. Myrtle Beach.

Major intersections

Special routes

Conway truck route

South Carolina Highway 90 Truck (SC 90 Truck) is a truck route of SC 90 that partially exists in Conway and Red Hill. It directs truck traffic onto U.S. Route 501 (US 501), SC 544 Conn., and US 501 Business (US 501 Bus.). It is loosely signed. Its entire length is concurrent with US 378 Truck and US 701 Truck.

Conway alternate route

South Carolina Highway 90 Alternate (SC 90 Alt.) was an alternate route that existed in the southeastern part of Conway and the far northern part of Red Hill. It was established in April 1937 and began at an intersection with US 501/SC 90 (now US 501 Business). It traveled to the east and immediately curved to the north-northeast. Just before reaching the Waccamaw River, it began a curve to the southeast and started to parallel the river. Just past the point where the river bent away from the highway, the alternate route curved to the south-southeast. It had an intersection with SC 90 on the Conway–Red Hill line. It continued until it reached its eastern terminus, a second intersection with US 501 (now US 501 Bus. and Washington Avenue).

Little River connector route

South Carolina Highway 90 Connector (SC 90 Conn.) is a  connector route of SC 90 that travels on a former segment of U.S. Route 17 (US 17) in the extreme southwestern corner of Little River. It connects Sea Mountain Highway with SC 90. It is known as Old Highway 17 and is an unsigned highway.

See also

References

External links

SC 90 at Virginia Highways' South Carolina Highways Annex
Former SC 90 ALT at Virginia Highways' South Carolina Highways Annex

Transportation in Horry County, South Carolina
090